The ANS Group of Companies is a news and broadcasting company in Azerbaijan.

It was founded by three young Azeri journalists, brothers Vahid and Seyfulla Mustafayev in 1990. The Company name, ANS, derives from the first letters of Azerbaijan News Service. ANS was the first privately owned company in the former Soviet Union.

Being an independent news company, ANS Group of Companies has played a significant role in the development of the independent media in Azerbaijan. Currently ANS Group of Companies owns four sub-companies: ANS TV, ANS ChM, ANS Press and ANS Kommers. The group has also being know for its outspokenness, as seen through it media outlets.

References

External links

 ANS TV
 ANS ChM
 ANS Kommers

Communications in Azerbaijan